is a Japanese actress and YouTuber active in Japan and Mexico. She is a former member of the Japanese idol group AKB48, in which she was a member of Team A. She is represented by the talent agency Ohta Production. She was part of the cast for the telenovela Like and lived in Mexico from 2018 to 2019.

Career 
Anna Iriyama started her career in the entertainment industry when in March 2010 she passed the 10th generation audition for the trainee section of the girl group AKB48. She debuted with AKB48 in June of the same year when she started performing in the AKB48 Theater.

She participated in that year's AKB48 general elections, but did not rank. In July 2011, she was promoted to AKB48's Team 4, thus becoming a full member of AKB48.

On December 17, 2011, Iriyama and two other AKB48 members, Ami Maeda and Rena Katō, held a large autograph-signing event in Hong Kong. The venue was packed with 6,000 people.

In 2012, on the AKB48 single "Manatsu no Sounds Good!", Iriyama made her first senbatsu appearance (meaning that she was selected to participate on the A-side of an AKB48 single for the first time). Despite that, she again did not rank in the AKB48 general elections for the year.

In September, together with Rina Kawaei and Rena Kato, she became a member of an AKB48 subgroup named Anrire. On October 17, 2012, the subgroup released a single titled "Ikujinashi Masquerade" together with Rino Sashihara, which charted at number one in the Japanese Oricon weekly singles chart.

In April 2013, Iriyama scored the highest in a general knowledge test called Mechaike AKB Kimatsu Test, held by the television show Mecha-Mecha Iketeru!. In the AKB48 election held in the same year, she ranked in the 30th place.

In 2014, Iriyama played her first starring (main cast) TV drama role, in the series Kekkon Sasete Kudasai!! Episode 3 "Ai no Tomato" scheduled to broadcast from May 26 to 30.

In April, it was reported that Iriyama would soon make her debut in cinema, with the film Ao Oni. The movie is based on the horror game of the same name and will be released nationwide in Japan on July 5.

In AKB48's general elections for 2014, she placed 77th place on the first day, and eventually finished 20th overall, with 34,002 votes.

In AKB48's general elections for 2016, she placed 18th with 36,894 votes. It is the highest position for her at the time. Iriyama released her first solo photobook, on March 22, 2017.

In March 2018, it was announced that Iriyama would join the cast of a Mexican telenovela titled Like La Leyenda. Her character, Keiko Kobayashi, is a Japanese girl with a mysterious past who came to Mexico to attend the titular school and doesn't speak English or Spanish. Her last appearance before leaving for Mexico was on April 1 at Saitama Super Arena, and she would be living there for about a year.

On April 11, 2019, Iriyama launched her YouTube channel, focusing her initial videos on travel throughout Mexico, speaking Spanish in them with Japanese subtitles. Her first video, is her introduction, as seen from the point of view of fans as well as Like, La Leyenda actors, staff and director.

On January 4, 2022, during a New Year's livestream on her YouTube channel, Iriyama announced her graduation from AKB48. Her last theater performance took place on March 16 and final activity with them was on the following day, March 17.

On February 5, Iriyama announced that she has passed the B1 level of the DELE Spanish proficiency test.

After graduating from AKB48, Iriyama continues to work in the entertainment industry as an actress in her home country Japan, with sporadic visits to Mexico.

On July 30, 2022, Iriyama launched her Japanese-language YouTube channel, with her first video there being of her talking about her career from her time in AKB48 to today.

Attack 

On May 25, 2014, during an event held at the Iwate Industry Culture & Convention Center in Takizawa, Iwate, she, along with AKB48 member Rina Kawaei and a staff member were attacked by a 24-year-old man wielding a handsaw. She and Kawaei suffered bone fractures and lacerations to their hands (Iriyama's right little finger and Kawaei's right thumb were fractured and cut, Iriyama also suffered cuts to her head) and were taken to the hospital for surgery. The event, as well as all other group activities on that day, were halted.

Discography

Singles with AKB48

Singles with Anrire 
 "Ikujinashi Masquerade" (2012) - Rino Sashihara feat. Anrire

Filmography

Music videos

TV dramas 
 Majisuka Gakuen 2 (2011) as Anna
 Majisuka Gakuen 3 (2012) as Annin
 Majisuka Gakuen 4 (2015) as Yoga
 Majisuka Gakuen 5 (2015) as Yoga
 AKB Horror Night: Adrenaline's Night Ep.11 - Fax (2015) as Tomomi
 AKB Love Night: Love Factory Ep.3 - Love of Rain Sound (2016) as Takane
 Crow's Blood (2016) as Aoi Nojiri
 Cabasuka Gakuen (2016) Ep.8 as Yoga/Iruka
 Like (2018) Televisa as Keiko Kobayashi (Mexican TV Series)
 Iine! Hikaru Genji-kun (2020)

Movies 
 Ao Oni (2014)
 Ai Ai Gasa (2018)

Bibliography

Solo photobooks

References

External links 
 
 Ohta Production official profile
 
 

1995 births
Living people
AKB48 members
Japanese idols
Japanese women pop singers
21st-century Japanese actresses
Musicians from Chiba Prefecture
Telenovela actresses
Japanese expatriates in Mexico
Stabbing survivors